The Zhytomyr Oblast Council is the regional oblast council (parliament) of the Zhytomyr Oblast (province) located in northern Ukraine. 

Council members are elected for five year terms. In order to gain representation in the council, a party more than 5 percent of the total vote.

Recent elections

2020
Distribution of seats after the 2020 Ukrainian local elections

Election date was 25 October 2020

2015
Distribution of seats after the 2015 Ukrainian local elections

Election date was 25 October 2015

Chairmen

Regional Executive Committee
 1937–1938 Aleksandr Faibishev
 1938–1941 Vladimir Perov
 1941–1945 (World War II) Nazi Germany occupation
 1945–1949 Mykola Rozhanchuk
 1949–1955 Zakhar Bohatyr
 1955–1982 Viktor Kremenetsky
 1982–1989 Vasyl Yamchynsky
 1990–1990 Anton Malynovsky

Regional Council
 1990–1991 Volodymyr Fedorov
 1991–1992 Anton Malynovsky
 1992–1994 Stanislav Rashevsky
 1994–1998 Anton Malynovsky
 1998–2006 Arkhyp Voitenko
 2006–2008 Iryna Syniavska
 2008–2010 Vitaliy Frantsuz
 2010–2014 Yosyp Zapalovsky
 2014–2015 Vitaliy Frantsuz
 2015–2016 Anzhelika Labunska
 2016– Volodymyr Shyrma

References

Council
Regional legislatures of Ukraine
Unicameral legislatures